Hibiscus hastatus is a large shrub or tree in the family Malvaceae. H. hastatus is known by its common name of Purau teruere or Tahiti hibiscus.

The blossoms of H. hastatus are pale yellow (occasionally with intermittent pale red petal margins) and a deep red center upon opening. Over the course of the day, the flowers deepen to orange and finally red before they senesce.

Leaves are variably 3-lobed with some leaves being more slender and nearly lobeless ('hastatus' refers to the spear-like shape of the leaves).

Some references treat H. hastatus as a subspecies of Hibiscus tiliaceus.

References

http://www2.bishopmuseum.org/HBS/botany/cultivatedplants
http://www.agroforestry.net/tti/H.tiliaceus-beach-hibiscus.pdf
https://web.archive.org/web/20080221220926/http://www.botany.hawaii.edu/FACULTY/CARR/page12.htm

hastatus